Jody Naranjo is a contemporary Tewa pottery maker from the Santa Clara Pueblo, New Mexico in the United States. She comes from a family of traditional Tewa potters. She learned the craft of pottery from her mother and other female relatives. She attended the Institute of American Indian Arts. Naranjo was selling her artwork at age fifteen at the New Mexico History Museum. Her style is identifiable and showcase her keen sense of humour. Jody has 3 daughters and maintains her connections to her heritage and friends.

Technique 
She uses traditional methods to make her pottery, including digging the clay from pueblo lands and processing the raw clay. She sifts, soaks, and strains the raw clay in into pottery-grade clay. She uses the coiling and pit firing to make her pots. Images of women, which she calls "pueblo girls," and animals, are a common themes in her artworks. She participates in the Santa Fe Indian Market. She won first prize in pottery at the Market in 2011. She has served as an artist-in-residence at the Eiteljorg Museum of American Indians and Western Art. In 2007 she won best in show at the Eiteljorg's Indian Market. Her work has been exhibited at the Heard Museum.

See also
Nora Naranjo-Morse, Jody Naranjo's aunt 
Jody Folwell, her aunt 
Roxanne Swentzell, her cousin

References

External links
Official website

Living people
Santa Clara Pueblo people
Native American potters
American women ceramists
American ceramists
Native American women artists
Year of birth missing (living people)
Women potters
21st-century American women artists
21st-century ceramists
21st-century Native Americans
21st-century Native American women